Maleeva is a surname. Notable people with the surname include:

Katerina Maleeva (born 1969), Bulgarian tennis player
Magdalena Maleeva (born 1975), Bulgarian tennis player
Manuela Maleeva (born 1967), Bulgarian tennis player

See also
Yulia Berberian-Maleeva (born 1944), Bulgarian tennis player